Serbia national beach handball team is the national team of Serbia. It is governed by the Handball Federation of Serbia and takes part in international beach handball competitions.

Results

World Championships
2008 – 3rd place
2014 – 6th place

European Championships
2002 – 5th place
2004 – 8th place
2006 – 5th place
2007 – 4th place
2011 – 7th place
2013 – 4th place

See also
Serbia women's national beach handball team

External links
Official website
IHF profile

Beach handball
National beach handball teams
Beach handball